The Grenoble Alpes University Hospital (abbreviated as CHU Grenoble Alpes or CHUGA) is a French teaching hospital built in 1974. With a total capacity of over 2 133 beds in 2020, it is the main hospital of Grenoble and Isère in France. The CHU Grenoble receives all phone calls from the department of Isère dialled through the emergency number 15 (telephone number of emergency medical assistance service) via the Reception Center and Call Control.

Grenoble urban unit has nearly 500,000 inhabitants in the department of Isère of over 1.2 million. With an operating budget of €713 million in 2017, the hospital employs over 9 000 employees (including 2 000 doctors) that makes it the largest employer in the Grenoble area before STMicroelectronics and Schneider Electric. Hospital facilities are mainly located in La Tronche (Site Nord) and Echirolles (Site Sud) of Grenoble agglomeration.

As a teaching hospital, CHUGA is actively engaged in medical research (e.g. Clinatec, NanoBio, G-IN, IAB), including through its affiliation with Grenoble Alpes University.

Ranking 
CHU Grenoble Alpes is ranked as the 10th out of over 1400 public hospital in France. 
In 2020, CHUGA was ranked 45th worldwide in clinical medicine.

CHU Grenoble Alpes was the first university hospital to obtain a global A-level accreditation from HAS, the French National Authority for Health.

International cooperation 
Through Grenoble Alpes University, the hospital has partnerships with 653 universities in over 80 countries. It also maintains close partnerships with teaching hospitals in Quebec, Switzerland, Spain, Morocco, and China. In 2019, the hospital ensured 53 double degrees.

CHU Grenoble Alpes is the only French university hospital to be in strategic partnership with Médecins Sans Frontières

Due to its international location (see Grenoble) and its expertise, the hospital is known for attracting international patients. Since 2016, there has been an important influx of patients from Kuwait.

See also 
Hospital General of Grenoble
Grenoble Alpes University

References

Grenoble Alpes University
Hospital buildings completed in 1974
Hospitals in Grenoble
Hospitals established in 1974
Teaching hospitals in France
20th-century architecture in France